Polycladus is a genus of land planarians from South America, currently comprising a single species, Polycladus gayi, which occurs in the Valdivian Forest, Chile.

Description 
Polycladus is a very understudied genus of land planarians. It was defined as land planarians with a wide, flat and leaf-like body, having the entire ventral surface ciliated and with mouth and gonopore posteriorly shifted in relation to other land planarians. The copulatory apparatus has a well-developed permanent penis and the female canal enters the genital antrum ventrally. This definition, however, is incomplete regarding all anatomical structures currently considered in the definition of planarian genera.

Etymology 
The name Polycladus comes from Greek πολύ (many) + κλάδος (branch), referring to the branched intestine. Despite the name, Polycladus is not a species of the flatworm order Polycladida, but rather of Tricladida.

The specific epithet of the type-species, gayi, commemorates French naturalist Claude Gay.

References 

Geoplanidae
Rhabditophora genera
Fauna of the Valdivian temperate rainforest